Roel Mannaart (born 10 February 1994) is a Dutch kickboxer. He currently competes in K-1, where he is the current K-1 Heavyweight Champion. He also competed for Glory.

Mannaart was ranked as a top ten heavyweight by Combat Press between July 2019 and July 2021, peaking at #7.

Kickboxing career
Manaart beat Semmie Onoiafie at Fighting Rookies in May 2016. He won the fight by a second round TKO. He would notch up three more wins in the Dutch circuit, defeating Michael Lorenz, Thomas Bridgewater and Nico Pereira Horta.

Mannaart participated in the 2017 K-1 Heavyweight Grand Prix, being scheduled to fight Masahiro Iwashita in the quarterfinals. He beat Iwashita by a first round knockout, but lost to Ibrahim El Bouni by knockout in the semifinals.

Four months later, Mannaart was scheduled to fight Antonio Plazibat for the K-1 Heavyweight title at K-1: K'FESTA.1. Roel won the fight by unanimous decision.

Mannaart subsequently signed with Glory as well, and fought Daniel Škvor at Glory 59: Amsterdam. He beat Skvor by unanimous decision. In his next fight with Glory, Mannaart was scheduled to fight Kirill Kornilov, whom he beat by unanimous decision.

Mannaart was scheduled to defend his K-1 title against Chris Bradford, at K-1 World GP 2019 Yokohamatsuri. He knocked Bradford out in the first round.

Roel Mannaart returned to Glory at Glory 75: Utrecht to fight Sergej Maslobojev. Maslobojev won the fight by a first round TKO, with Mannaart suffering a broken jaw during the bout.

Championships and accomplishments

 2018 K-1 Heavyweight Champion

Kickboxing record

|- style="text-align:center; background:#fbb;"
|  2020-02-29 || Loss || align="left" | Sergej Maslobojev || Glory 75: Utrecht || Utrecht, Netherlands || TKO (Corner stoppage) || 1 || 1:48

|-  style="text-align:center; background:#cfc;"
| 2019-11-24 || Win|| align=left| Chris Bradford||  K-1 World GP 2019 Yokohamatsuri  || Yokohama, Japan || KO (Punches)|| 1 || 2:19 
|-
! style=background:white colspan=9 |

|- style="background:#cfc;"
|- align="center" bgcolor="#cfc"
| 2018-12-08 || Win ||align=left| Kirill Kornilov || Glory 62: Rotterdam  || Rotterdam, Netherlands || Decision (Unanimous) || 3 || 3:00

|- align="center" bgcolor="#CCFFCC"
| 2018-09-29 || Win ||align=left| Daniel Škvor || Glory 59: Amsterdam  || Amsterdam, Netherlands || Decision (Unanimous) || 3 || 3:00

|- align="center"  bgcolor="#CCFFCC"
| 2018-03-21 || Win || align=left| Antonio Plazibat || K-1 World GP 2018: K'FESTA.1 || Saitama, Japan || Decision (Unanimous) || 3 || 3:00
|-
! style=background:white colspan=9 |

|- align="center" bgcolor="#FFBBBB"
| 2017-11-23 || Loss ||align=left| Ibrahim El Bouni || K-1 World GP 2017 Heavyweight Championship Tournament, Semi Finals || Saitama, Japan || KO (Uppercut) || 1 || 3:00 

|-align="center"  bgcolor="#CCFFCC"
| 2017-11-23 || Win ||align=left| Masahiro Iwashita || K-1 World GP 2017 Heavyweight Championship Tournament, Quarter Finals || Saitama, Japan || KO (Left hook) || 1 || 2:47 

|- style="background:#cfc;"
| 2017-05-03 || Win ||align=left| Nico Pereira Horta || Rings Fighting Network Amstelveen || Netherlands || Decision (Unanimous) || 3 || 3:00

|- style="background:#cfc;"
| 2017-04-08 || Win ||align=left| Rinor Latifaj || Road 2 Victory Sokudo || Hoorn, Netherlands || TKO (Doctor stoppage) || 2 ||

|- style="background:#cfc;"
| 2016-10-23 || Win ||align=left| Thomas Bridgewater || RINGS Beverwijk 2016 || Netherlands || TKO (Corner stoppage) || 3 || 

|- style="background:#cfc;"
| 2016-06-04 || Win ||align=left| Michael Lorenz || Day of Destruction 11 || Germany || KO (Body kick) || 1 || 1:40

|- style="background:#cfc;"
| 2016-05-22 || Win ||align=left| Semmie Onoiafie || Fighting Rookies || Amsterdam, Netherlands || TKO || 2 || 
|-

|- style="background:#cfc;"
| 2015-04-18 || Win ||align=left| Piotr Mlinski || Day of Destruction 10 || Hamburg, Germany || TKO (Corner stoppage) || 3 || 0:52
|-

|- style="background:#cfc;"
| 2015-02-14 || Win ||align=left| Patrick Dierichsweiler || Rissing Sun 2.0 || Beilen, Netherlands || TKO (Retirement) || 2 || 3:00
|-

|- style="background:#cfc;"
| 2014-09-28 || Win ||align=left| André Agbobly || WFL Mejiro || Zaandam, Netherlands || Decision (Unanimous) || 3 || 2:00 

|- style="background:#cfc;"
| 2014-03-15 || Win ||align=left| Nafpaktos Heil || Fight For Victory V || Egmond aan Zee, Netherlands || Decision (Unanimous) || 3 || 3:00 

|- style="background:#cfc;"
| 2013-12-01 || Win ||align=left| Chris Berkhout || Fight Fans 7 || Netherlands || Decision || 3 || 3:00 

|- style="background:#cfc;"
| 2013-05-11 || Win ||align=left| Ozan Sert || Mejiro Gym Event || Amsterdam, Netherlands || TKO (Retirement) || 1 || 3:00 
|-
|}
Legend:

See also
List of male kickboxers
List of K-1 champions

References

External links
Glory profile

1994 births
Living people
Dutch male kickboxers
Glory kickboxers
Heavyweight kickboxers
Sportspeople from Zaanstad
Kickboxing champions